L'Hôtellerie-de-Flée is a former commune in the Maine-et-Loire department in western France. On 15 December 2016, it was merged into the new commune Segré-en-Anjou Bleu.

Geography
The river Oudon flows through the commune and forms part of its south-western border.

See also
Communes of the Maine-et-Loire department

References

Hotelleriedeflee